The Soribada Best K-Music Awards (previously abbreviated as SOKA and currently abbreviated as SOBA) is an awards ceremony presented by the digital music platform Soribada to celebrate the best and brightest of K-pop releases. The first awards ceremony was held in September 2017 and awarded music released between September 2016 and August 2017.

This is the first-ever awards ceremony hosted by Soribada which was established in 2000 as the first digital music service in Korea.

List of ceremonies

Judging criteria 
Winners are determined through Soribada's internal data, online and mobile votes from fans across the world, as well as ratings from professional adjudicators and critics.

Grand Prize (Daesang)

Main Prize (Bonsang)

Rookie Award

Popularity Award

Genre Awards

Trot Grand Award

Trot Artist Award

Rising Trot Award

Hip Hop Artist Award

R&B Artist Award

Rock Band Award

Best OST Award

Music Video Award

Music Producer Awards

Producer Award

Songwriter Award

Best Hip Hop Maker Award

Special Hallyu Awards

Artist of the Year Award

Music of the Year Award

Stage of the Year Award

Artist Award

Performance Award

Rising Hot Star Award

Icon Award

Voice Award

Music Star Award

Global Entertainer Award

Social Artist Award

Global Hot Trend Award

Next Artist Award

Other Awards

Most Wins
The following artists received five or more awards:

Notes

References 

Awards established in 2017
Recurring events established in 2017
2017 establishments in South Korea
Annual events in South Korea
South Korean music awards
Events in Seoul
Music in Seoul